Dispute over the Status and Use of the Waters of the Silala (Chile v. Bolivia) is a case at the International Court of Justice. In the case, Chile petitioned the Court to declare the Silala River an "international watercourse whose use by Chile and Bolivia is governed by customary international law." Chile presented the case in 2016 while the Bolivian case against Chile, Obligation to Negotiate Access to the Pacific Ocean, was still ongoing. According to France 24 the case came as a surprise.

Bolivia's position is that the waters of the Silala flow into Chile through artificial channels, while Chile claims that it is an international river. 

Within the context of the Bolivian demand for sovereign access to the Pacific Ocean Bolivian President Evo Morales has threatened to reduce the flow into Chile and charge Chile for the use of its water.

On December 1st, 2022, the ICJ delivered its judgment in the case. It found that the 'parties agree with respect to the legal status of the Silala River', and therefore the Court was not called upon to give a decision.

References

International Court of Justice cases
Bolivia–Chile relations
Water conflicts